Petra Kamstra (born 18 March 1974) is a former professional tennis player from the Netherlands, who won one WTA-title in doubles during her career. She reached her individual career-high singles ranking on 2 October 1995, when Kamstra became the number 70 of the world. Twice she was named the Rotterdam Sportswoman of the Year (1990 and 1992).

WTA Tour finals

Doubles 1 (1–0)

ITF finals

Singles Finals (2-4)

Doubles Finals (2-2)

External links
 
 

1974 births
Living people
Dutch female tennis players
Sportspeople from Rotterdam
20th-century Dutch women
21st-century Dutch women